Agha Siraj Durrani (born 1953) is a Pakistani politician who is the current Speaker of the Provincial Assembly of Sindh, in office since 2013.

He was the Speaker of the 12th Provincial Assembly of Sindh. His father, Agha Sadaruddin, and uncle Agha Badruddin also served as speakers of the same assembly. He is ethnically Durrani Pashtun.

Political career
Hailing from Garhi Yasin, Durrani first contested elections in 1985 during the Zia regime, in which he lost. He joined the Pakistan Peoples Party and secured a victory in 1988 elections. He is a confidante of PPP chairman Asif Ali Zardari. In 1990, during Nawaz Sharif government he was imprisoned for some time for corruption charges.

Durrani matriculated from the St Patrick's High School in Karachi in 1971, followed by a bachelor of commerce. He also pursued an LLB degree at the Sindh Muslim Law College. During the 1980s, he left for the United States where he ran a hardware business.

References

Living people
Sindh MPAs 2013–2018
Pakistan People's Party MPAs (Sindh)
Pakistani expatriates in the United States
Pashtun people
People from Shikarpur District
Politicians from Sindh
Speakers of the Provincial Assembly of Sindh
St. Patrick's High School, Karachi alumni
Sindh Muslim Law College alumni
1955 births
Pakistani prisoners and detainees